Alexander Sheafe was the Governor of the Bank of England from 1752 to 1754. He had been Deputy Governor from 1750 to 1752. He replaced William Hunt as Governor and was succeeded by Charles Palmer.

See also
Chief Cashier of the Bank of England

References

External links

Governors of the Bank of England
Year of birth missing
Year of death missing
British bankers
Deputy Governors of the Bank of England